Edward Hagen is the name of:

 Edward Hagen (anthropologist) (born 1962), American biological anthropologist and professor
 Edward Hagen (handballer) (1908–1963), American handball player
 Edward Hagen (Minnesota politician) (1875–1950), American farmer, educator and politician